Gabriel B. Mindlin is a Professor of physics at the University of Buenos Aires and a scientist whose research focuses on the physical mechanisms underlying the production of songs by songbirds.

His research has produced mathematical and computer models which realistically reproduces songs of several species.  He has published three books and over 100 original research papers in peer-reviewed journals and conference proceedings which have received over 2400 citations.

Mindlin graduated in physics from University of La Plata (Argentina, 1987) and received a PhD from Drexel University (1991). He was Senior Fellow of Santa Fe Institute (2002–2004) and received an Arthur Taylor Winfree award from the International Center for Theoretical Physics (Trieste, 2004). In addition, he was elected a Fellow of the American Association for the Advancement of Science (2010).

Selected publications

References

External links 
 Dynamical Systems Lab, at University of Buenos Aires

Year of birth missing (living people)
Living people
Argentine physicists
National University of La Plata alumni
Drexel University alumni
Academic staff of the University of Buenos Aires